North Hoosick is a hamlet in Rensselaer County, New York, United States. North Hoosick has a post office with ZIP code 12133.

References

Hamlets in Rensselaer County, New York
Hamlets in New York (state)